Prostanthera althoferi is a species of flowering plant in the family Lamiaceae and is endemic to inland areas of Australia. It is an erect shrub with its stems and leaves densely covered with silvery, greyish-green hairs, and has narrow egg-shaped leaves and white to cream-coloured flowers with mauve or purple striations inside.

Description
Flowering occurs from March to October.

Taxonomy
Prostanthera althoferi was first formally described in 1988 by Barry Conn in the journal Nuytsia from specimens collected near Leonora in 1975. The specific epithet (althoferi) honours George Althofer. In the same journal, Conn described two subspecies and the names are accepted by the Australian Plant Census:

Distribution and habitat
This mintbush grows on sandplains, granite outcrops, low sandy rises and dunes. Subspecies althoferi is restricted to Western Australia where it is found in the Avon Wheatbelt, Coolgardie, Great Victoria Desert, Murchison and Yalgoo biogeographic regions. Subspecies longifolia occurs in the southern part of the Northern Territory and the northern arid and western pastoral regions and Eyre Peninsula in South Australia.

Conservation status
Prostanthera althoferi subsp. althoferi is classified as "not threatened" by the Western Australian Government Department of Parks and Wildlife.

References

althoferi
Flora of Western Australia
Flora of South Australia
Flora of the Northern Territory
Lamiales of Australia
Taxa named by Barry John Conn
Plants described in 1988